Kazan is a 1949 American drama western film directed by Will Jason and starring Stephen Dunne, Lois Maxwell and Joe Sawyer. It is based on a novel by James Oliver Curwood which had previously been made into a 1921 silent film of the same title.

The film's sets were designed by the art director Paul Palmentola.

Cast
 Stephen Dunne as Thomas Weyman 
 Lois Maxwell as Louise Maitlin 
 Joe Sawyer as Sandz Jepson 
 Roman Bohnen as Maitlin 
 George Cleveland as Trapper 
 John Dehner as Henri Le Clerc 
 Ray Teal as McCready 
 Loren Gage as Bartender 
 Zoro the Dog as Kazan

References

Bibliography
 Goble, Alan. The Complete Index to Literary Sources in Film. Walter de Gruyter, 1999.

External links
 

1949 films
1949 drama films
American drama films
Films directed by Will Jason
Columbia Pictures films
American black-and-white films
Films set in Canada
Remakes of American films
Sound film remakes of silent films
Films about dogs
Films based on novels by James Oliver Curwood
1940s English-language films
1940s American films
English-language drama films